From My Heart to Yours may refer to:
 From My Heart to Yours, an album by LeAnn Rimes
 "From My Heart to Yours" (song), a song by Laura Izibor